Aspira is a  skyscraper in the Denny Triangle neighborhood of Seattle, Washington. It has 37 floors, and mostly consists of apartments, of which there are 325 units. Parking spaces total 355. Construction began in 2007 and was completed in late 2009. The building is located on Stewart Street at Terry Avenue.

History

Urban Partners first proposed a 37-story residential and retail tower on the parking lot of the Gethsemane Lutheran Church, located south of the intersection of Stewart Street and Terry Avenue, in July 2006.

Construction on the tower began in 2007. The project was completed in late 2009 and opened to tenants in March 2010.

In November 2012, the tower was sold to TIAA-CREF for $165.7 million, setting a new regional record with a per-unit price of $509,760.

See also
List of tallest buildings in Seattle

References

External links
Aspira Seattle

Residential skyscrapers in Seattle
Residential buildings completed in 2009